Abdul Razak bin Abdul Rahman is a Malaysian politician who has served as Member of the Melaka State Executive Council (EXCO) in the Barisan Nasional (BN) state administration under Chief Minister Sulaiman Md Ali since November 2021 and Member of the Melaka State Legislative Assembly (MLA) for Telok Mas since November 2021. He is a member of the United Malays National Organisation (UMNO), a component party of the ruling BN coalition.

Election results

Honours
  :
  Companion Class II of the Exalted Order of Malacca (DPSM) – Datuk (2014)

References

External link 
 
 

Malaysian people of Malay descent
Malaysian Muslims
United Malays National Organisation politicians
21st-century Malaysian politicians
Members of the Malacca State Legislative Assembly
Malacca state executive councillors
People from Malacca
Living people
1973 births